Mysteries of Life is a 1973 granite sculpture by James Washington Jr., installed on the Washington State Capitol campus in Olympia, Washington, United States.

References

1973 establishments in Washington (state)
1973 sculptures
Granite sculptures in Washington (state)
Outdoor sculptures in Olympia, Washington
Washington State Capitol campus